Amashukeli is a Georgian surname which may refer to:

Vasil Amashukeli (1886–1977), Georgian film director
Elguja Amashukeli (1928–2002), Georgian sculptor
Besik Amashukeli (born 1972), Georgian footballer
Marie Amachoukeli (born 1979), French film director of Georgian origin
Nika Amashukeli (born 1994), Georgian rugby referee

Georgian-language surnames